Pondicharry Rangaraj (born 17 May 1968) is an Indian former cricketer. He played two first-class matches for Hyderabad in 1989/90.

See also
 List of Hyderabad cricketers

References

External links
 

1968 births
Living people
Indian cricketers
Hyderabad cricketers
Cricketers from Bangalore